
Gmina Orchowo is a rural gmina (administrative district) in Słupca County, Greater Poland Voivodeship, in west-central Poland.

Villages
Gmina Orchowo contains the villages and settlements of Bielsko, Gałczynek, Głucha Puszcza, Kinno, Kosakowo, Linowiec, Mlecze, Myślątkowo, Orchówek, Orchowo, Osowiec, Ostrówek, Podbielsko, Podlesie, Rękawczyn, Rękawczynek, Różanna, Siedluchno, Skubarczewo, Słowikowo, Suszewo, Szydłowiec and Wólka Orchowska.

Neighbouring gminas
Gmina Orchowo is bordered by the gminas of Jeziora Wielkie, Kleczew, Mogilno, Powidz, Strzelno, Trzemeszno, Wilczyn and Witkowo.

References
Polish official population figures 2006

Orchowo
Słupca County